Tsilavina Ramanantsoa (born April 24, 1992) is a Malagasy swimmer. At the 2012 Summer Olympics, he competed in the Men's 200 metre breaststroke

References

Malagasy male swimmers
Living people
Olympic swimmers of Madagascar
Swimmers at the 2012 Summer Olympics
Male breaststroke swimmers
Swimmers at the 2010 Summer Youth Olympics
1992 births